Shirley Gauntlet  is an Indian athlete. She won a bronze medal in long jump in 1951 Asian Games.

References

Athletes (track and field) at the 1951 Asian Games
Indian female long jumpers
Asian Games bronze medalists for India
Asian Games medalists in athletics (track and field)
Medalists at the 1951 Asian Games